Clanoptilus elegans is a species of beetles belonging to the family Melyridae, the soft-winged flower beetles. It is found in Europe.

References

External links 

 
 
 Clanoptilus elegans at faunaeur.org
 Clanoptilus elegans at Biolib

Melyridae
Beetles described in 1790
Beetles of Europe